Rhea Carmi (Hebrew: ברוריה כרמי, born 1942) (variant name: Bruria Carmi), is an Israeli American abstract expressionist and mixed-media artist.

Life and work
Carmi was born in Jerusalem. She studied visual art at Tel Aviv University 1974-1976, and attended Ramat-Gan Institute for The Arts 1977-1979. Her mentors were Israeli artists Arie Aroch and Motti Mizrachi.

Carmi utilizes a variety of media—oils, sand, water, treated paper, canvas and wood—which she layers, smooths and sculpts. The paintings are a personal diary of the artist.

Carmi is a member of the ARTROM Gallery Guild  and served as juror for Abstract Forms for the ARTROM International Art Competition 2008

She lives and works in Los Angeles, California.

Her name means: Flowing she is part of the Earth.

Solo exhibitions
 1980 Beit Yad LeBanim Tel Aviv, Israel
 1980 The Tel Aviv Art Pavilion Tel Aviv, Israel
 1980/1981  Turel Art Gallery  Tel Aviv, Israel
 1981  13&1/2 Gallery  Jaffa, Israel
 2004  Lawrence Asher Gallery Los Angeles, CA
 2005  Lawrence Asher Gallery Los Angeles, CA
 2006  The Gotthelf Art Gallery Los Angeles, CA
 2006 Lawrence Asher Gallery  Los Angeles, CA
 2007 LA Contemporary Los Angeles, CA
 2008 Soka University of America, Founder's Hall Art Gallery  Aliso Viejo, CA
 2008 Frank Pictures Gallery  Santa Monica, CA
 2008 Villa di Donato Napoli, Italy
 2009 Concordia University Irvine, CA

Group exhibitions
 1980/1981 Turel Art Gallery New York, NY
 1984 Pacific Design Center Los Angeles, CA
 2004 B.G.H Gallery Santa Monica, CA
 2004 TarFest Los Angeles, CA
 2005 Municipal Art Gallery Los Angeles, CA
 2006 Klapper Gallery Los Angeles, CA
 2007 Art Pic North Hollywood, CA
 2007 Galerie Le Cocon  Hamburg, Germany
 2007 Torrance Art Museum Torrance, CA
 2007/2008 Riverside Art Museum Riverside, CA
 2009 CAP Gallery Laguna Beach, CA
 2009 USC Hillel/companion show to MAG(Barnsdall) LA, CA
 2010 Bell Gallery Los Angeles, CA
 2010 Gotthelf Art Gallery La Jola, CA
 2010 the Jewish Federation's Bell Family Gallery, Los Angeles, CA
 2010 Four Seasons Hotel Gallery, Westlake Village, CA
 2010 Orange County Center for Contemporary Art, Santa Ana, CA
 2010 Los Angeles Municipal Art Gallery, Los Angeles, CA
 2010 Gotthelf Art Gallery, La Jolla, CA
 2010 Four Seasons Hotel Gallery, Westlake Village, CA
 2011 Four Seasons Hotel Gallery, Westlake Village, CA
 2011 "Text and Texture", Fresh Paint Gallery, Culver City, CA
 2012 Four Seasons Hotel Gallery, Westlake Village, CA
 2012 Keller Williams, Encino, CA
 2012 LA Art Platform, Santa Monica, CA
 2012 "40/40" USC Hillel, Santa Monica, CA

Public collections
Carmi's work is included in the public collections of:
 Museum of Tolerance, Los Angeles, CA
 Soka University of America, Aliso Viejo, CA

See also
 Abstract expressionism
 Abstract art
 Postmodernism
 Mixed media
 Shaped canvas

References

External links
 

1942 births
Living people
Mixed-media artists
Abstract expressionist artists
Postmodern artists
American contemporary painters
American women painters
American abstract artists
American people of Israeli descent
Painters from California
Israeli painters
Israeli women painters
Abstract painters
20th-century American painters
21st-century American painters
20th-century American women artists
21st-century American women artists